Phi (uppercase Φ, lowercase φ or ϕ;  pheî ; Modern Greek:  fi ) is the 21st letter of the Greek alphabet.

During the later part of Classical Antiquity, in Koine Greek (c. 4th century BC to 4th century AD), its pronunciation shifted to that of a voiceless bilabial fricative, and by the Byzantine Greek period (c. 4th century AD to 15th century AD) it developed its modern pronunciation as a voiceless labiodental fricative.
The romanization of the Modern Greek phoneme is therefore usually .

It may be that phi originated as the letter qoppa (Ϙ, ϙ), and initially represented the sound  before shifting to Classical Greek . In traditional Greek numerals, phi has a value of 500 or 500,000. The Cyrillic letter Ef (Ф, ф) descends from phi.

As with other Greek letters, lowercase phi (encoded as the Unicode character ) is used as a mathematical or scientific symbol. Some uses, such as the golden ratio, require the old-fashioned 'closed' glyph, which is separately encoded as the Unicode character .

Use as a symbol 

The lowercase letter φ (or often its variant, ϕ) is often used to represent the following:
 Magnetic flux in physics
 The letter phi is commonly used in physics to represent wave functions in quantum mechanics, such as in the Schrödinger equation and bra–ket notation: .
 The golden ratio   ... in mathematics, art, and architecture.
 Euler's totient function φ(n) in number theory; also called Euler's phi function.
 The cyclotomic polynomial functions Φn(x) of algebra.
 The number of phases in a power system in electrical engineering, for example 1ϕ for single phase, 3ϕ for three phase.
 In algebra, group or ring homomorphisms
 In probability theory,  is the probability density function of the standard normal distribution.
 In probability theory,  is the characteristic function of a random variable X.
 An angle, typically the second angle mentioned, after θ (theta). It can denote:
 The argument of a complex number.
 The phase of a wave in signal processing.
 In spherical coordinates, mathematicians usually refer to phi as the polar angle (from the z-axis).  The convention in physics is to use phi as the azimuthal angle (from the x-axis).
 One of the dihedral angles in the backbones of proteins in a Ramachandran plot
 Internal or effective angle of friction.
 The work function of a surface, in solid-state physics.
 A shorthand representation for an aromatic functional group in organic chemistry.
 The fugacity coefficient in thermodynamics.
 The ratio of free energy destabilizations of protein mutants in phi value analysis.
 In cartography, geodesy and navigation, latitude.
 In aircraft flight mechanics as the symbol for bank angle (sometimes represented with the letter theta, which is also used for pitch angle).
 In combustion engineering, fuel–air equivalence ratio. The ratio between the actual fuel-air ratio to the stoichiometric fuel-air ratio.
 In soil engineering, φ is a logarithmic unit of sediment grain size, defined such that a change of 1 φ in grain size corresponds to a factor of 2 in grain diameter.
 A sentence in first-order logic.
 The Veblen function in set theory.
 Porosity in geology and hydrology.
 Strength (or resistance) reduction factor in structural engineering, used to account for statistical variabilities in materials and construction methods.
 The symbol for a voiceless bilabial fricative in the International Phonetic Alphabet (using the straight-line variant form).
 In philosophy, φ is often used as shorthand for a generic act. (Also in uppercase.)
 In perceptual psychology, the phi phenomenon is the apparent motion caused by the successive viewing of stationary objects, such as the frames of a motion picture.
 In lexical-functional grammar, the function that maps elements from the c-structure to the f-structure.
 In ecology, site survival probability, or the probability that a species will continue to occupy a site if it was there the previous year.
 The logo of La France Insoumise, a leftist French political party.
 An abbreviation for the word bacteriophage
 Mϕ is used as an abbreviation for the word macrophage

The uppercase letter Φ is used as a symbol for:
 The golden ratio conjugate −0.618... in mathematics.
 The cumulative distribution function (cdf) of standard normal distribution in statistics.
 The magnetic flux and electric flux in physics, with subscripts distinguishing the two.
 In philosophy, Φ is often used as shorthand for a generic act. (Also in lowercase.)
 A common symbol for the parametrization of a surface in vector calculus.
 In Lacanian algebra, Φ stands for the imaginary phallus and also represents phallic signification; −Φ stands in for castration.
The diameter symbol in engineering, ⌀, is often erroneously referred to as "phi", and the diameter symbol is sometimes erroneously typeset as Φ. This symbol is used to indicate the diameter of a circular section; for example, "⌀14" means the diameter of the circle is 14 units.
 A clock signal in electronics is often called Phi or uses the symbol.

Computing 
In Unicode, there are multiple forms of the phi letter:

In ordinary Greek text, the character U+03C6 φ is used exclusively, although this character has considerable glyphic variation, sometimes represented with a glyph more like the representative glyph shown for U+03C6 (φ, the "loopy" or "open" form), and less often with a glyph more like the representative glyph shown for U+03D5 (ϕ, the "stroked" or "closed" form).

Because Unicode represents a character in an abstract way, the choice between glyphs is purely a matter of font design. While some Greek typefaces, most notably those in the Porson family (used widely in editions of classical Greek texts), have a "stroked" glyph in this position, most other typefaces have "loopy" glyphs. This also applies to the "Didot" (or "apla") typefaces employed in most Greek book printing, as well as the "Neohellenic" typeface often used for ancient texts.

It is necessary to have the stroked glyph available for some mathematical uses, and U+03D5 GREEK PHI SYMBOL is designed for this function. Prior to Unicode version 3.0 (1998), the glyph assignments in the Unicode code charts were the reverse, and thus older fonts may still show a loopy form  at U+03D5.

For use as a phonetic symbol in IPA, Unicode has a separate code point U+0278, LATIN SMALL LETTER PHI, because only the stroked glyph is considered correct in this use. It typically appears in a form adapted to a Latin typographic environment, with a more upright shape than normal Greek letters and with serifs at the top and bottom.

In HTML/XHTML, the upper- and lowercase phi character entity references are &Phi; (Φ) and &phi; (φ), respectively.

In LaTeX, the math symbols are \Phi, \phi, and \varphi.

The Unicode standard also includes the following variants of phi and phi-like characters:

See also 
 F, f: Ef (Latin)
 Ф, ф: Ef (Cyrillic)
 中
 Psi and phi type figurine
 Փ (Armenian)
 Deposition (geology)
 Golden ratio

References

External links 
 
 
 
 

Greek letters